Ndejje University is a private, multi-campus, Christian university in Uganda.

Location
The main campus of the university lies adjacent to the Lady Irene Camps in Ndejje. The coordinates of Ndejje University Main Campus are:0°36'44.0"N, 32°28'34.0"E (Latitude:0.612222; Longitude:32.476111).

History

In 1995, "The Christian University of East Africa" with some government involvement was annexed by the Anglican Diocese of Luweero, in the Province of the Church of Uganda. The name of the university was changed to Ndejje University. In 1998, the institution received recognition as a tertiary level institution of higher learning by the government of Uganda through the Ugandan Ministry of Education and Sports.

Ownership of the university was expanded to include all six dioceses of the Church of Uganda in the Buganda Region. Ndejje University was issued a University Charter by the government of Uganda in 2009. The university offers  undergraduate and postgraduate programs that are recognized nationally and Internationally.

Campuses
, the university maintains the following campuses:

 The Main Campus - Located on Ndejje Hill, in Luweero District
 Lady Irene Campus - Also located on Ndejje Hill. Together, the two campuses in Ndejje occupy 
 The Kampala Campus - Located at 151 Balintuma Road, Mengo, in Kampala, Uganda's capital city.
 Nakasongola Campus - The university is in the process of acquiring  in Nakasongola District, to house the research facility in renewable energy and environmental management.

Faculties
, there were seven constituent faculties of the university and one school.

 Faculty of Arts
 Faculty of Business Administration and Management
 Faculty of Basic Sciences and IT
 Faculty of Education
 Faculty of Engineering
 Faculty of Environment and Agricultural Sciences
 Faculty of Social Sciences.
 Ndejje University Graduate School

Programs
Ndejje University offers both undergraduate and postgraduate courses including both diploma and degree programs.

Postgraduate programs
The following is a partial list of the postgraduate programs on offer.
 Master of Business Administration
 Master of Science in Information Systems
 Master of Education
 Master of Development Studies
 Master of Arts in Community Participation and Strategic Management Studies
 Master of Science in Marketing
 Master of Science in Finance
 Master of Science in Procurement and Supply Chain Management
 Master of Science in Human Resource Management
 Post Graduate Diploma in Business Administration
 Post Graduate Diploma in Institutional Management 
 Post Graduate Diploma in Sports Science
 Post Graduate Diploma in Physical Education & Sports Management
 Post Graduate Diploma in Sports Nutrition & Management
 Post Graduate Diploma in Education

Undergraduate degree programs
This is  partial list of undergraduate courses offered at Ndejje University.

 Bachelor of Business Administration
 Bachelor of Commerce
 Bachelor of Science in Human Resource Management
 Bachelor of Science in Accounting
 Bachelor of Science in Finance
 Bachelor of Science in Marketing
 Bachelor of Procurement Management
 Bachelor of Computer Science
 Bachelor of Business Computing & Information Management
 Bachelor of Public Relations Management
 Bachelor of Education
 Bachelor of Arts with Education
 Bachelor of Science with Education
 Bachelor of Business Education
 Bachelor of Education - Institutions Management
 Bachelor of Development Studies
 Bachelor of Guidance and Counseling
 Bachelor of Arts in Social Work and Social Administration
 Bachelor of Arts in Community Development
 Bachelor of Journalism and Mass Communication 
 Bachelor of Sports Science and Management
 Bachelor of Science in Sustainable Natural Resources
 Bachelor of Science in Plantation Forestry
 Bachelor of Forest Science & Environmental Management
 Bachelor of Sports Science
 Bachelor of Sports Nutrition & Management
 Bachelor of Physical Education & Sports Management
 Bachelor of Science in Chemical Engineering
 Bachelor of Science in Civil Engineering
 Bachelor of Science in Electrical Engineering
 Bachelor of Science in Mechanical Engineering
 Bachelor of Survey and Land Information Systems

Undergraduate diploma programs
This is a partial list of diploma courses offered at Ndejje University.

 Diploma in Primary Education
 Diploma in Secondary Education 
 Diploma in Computer Science
 Diploma in Commercial Arts & Design Technology
 Diploma in Guidance & Counseling 
 Diploma in Business Administration
 Diploma in Education Institutions Management
 Diploma in Sports Science
 Diploma in Sports Nutrition & Management
 Diploma in Physical Education & Sports Management
 Diploma in Nursery Teaching. Day, Evening and In-service programs

Advanced certificate programs
These are some of the certificate programs offered at Ndejje University.

 Advanced Certificate in Early Childhood Education
 Advanced Certificate in Nursery Teaching 
 Advanced Grade III Teachers Certificate
 Advanced Certificate in Business Administration.

Notable Almni
 Aloysius Mukasa - MP Rubaga South (2021- ), businessman and Member of National Unity Platform (NUP) and People Power, Our Power movement
 Cathy Patra, Dancer

See also
List of universities in Uganda
List of Business Schools in Uganda
Education in Uganda
Bombo 
Church of Uganda
Buganda Region

References

External links
  Official website

Universities and colleges in Uganda
Business schools in Uganda
Engineering universities and colleges in Uganda
Educational institutions established in 1992
1992 establishments in Uganda
Luweero District